Athletic Club Amboisien is a French association football club founded in 1920. They are based in the town of Amboise and their home stadium is the Stade Georges Boulogne. As of the 2009–10 season, the club plays in the Division d'Honneur de Centre, the sixth tier of French football.

External links
AC Amboise official website 

Football clubs in France
Association football clubs established in 1920
1920 establishments in France
Sport in Indre-et-Loire
Football clubs in Centre-Val de Loire